Melo miltonis, the southern bailer or southern baler, is a large sea snail, a marine gastropod mollusc in the family Volutidae, the volutes.

Distribution
This species distribution is restricted to Southwest Australia.

Habitat
The range extends from the Houtman Abrolhos, off the Western Australian coast, to South Australia.

Shell description
Shells of this species have long been used by the peoples of Australia to carry or remove water, hence the common name "bailer", which is also applied to many other volutes in this genus. The foot, which is very large, is also covered in concentric patterns of the same colours as the shell, and is often used to engulf prey.

References
 

Volutidae
Gastropods of Australia
Fauna of Western Australia
Gastropods described in 1834
Taxa named by Edward Griffith (zoologist)